The 2018 Italian Grand Prix (formally the Formula 1 Gran Premio Heineken d'Italia 2018) was a Formula One motor race held on 2 September 2018 at the Autodromo Nazionale di Monza in Monza, Italy. The race was the fourteenth round of the 2018 Formula One World Championship and marked the 88th running of the Italian Grand Prix and the 83rd time the race was held at Monza.

Mercedes driver Lewis Hamilton entered the round with a 17-point lead over Sebastian Vettel in the Drivers' Championship. In the World Constructors' Championship, Mercedes led Ferrari by 15 points.

Qualifying

Notes
  – Nico Hülkenberg received a 40-place grid penalty: 10 places for causing a collision at previous round and 30 places for exceeding his quota of power unit elements.
  – Daniel Ricciardo received a 30-place grid penalty for exceeding his quota of power unit elements.
  – Marcus Ericsson received a 10-place grid penalty for exceeding his quota of power unit elements.

Race report

The race was won by Lewis Hamilton after a battle with Kimi Räikkönen, Hamilton caught and passed Räikkönen with 9 laps remaining. On the opening lap Hamilton and Vettel collided causing Vettel to spin off. Despite Vettel's complaints, the stewards deemed it just a racing incident. Vettel would later fight back to 4th place, behind Valtteri Bottas in third. Max Verstappen was penalised 5 seconds after forcing Bottas off the track after a pit stop and was classified 5th. Sergey Sirotkin, driving for Williams, scored his only Formula 1 championship point, after Romain Grosjean was disqualified from 6th place after Renault successfully lodged a protest due to his Haas carrying an illegal floor.

Race classification

Notes
  – Max Verstappen originally finished third, but received a 5-second time penalty for causing a collision with Valtteri Bottas.
  – Romain Grosjean originally finished sixth, but was disqualified for a technical infringement with the floor of his car.

Championship standings after the race 

Drivers' Championship standings

Constructors' Championship standings

 Note: Only the top five positions are included for both sets of standings.

See also
 2018 Monza Formula 2 round
 2018 Monza GP3 Series round

References

Italian
Grand Prix
Italian Grand Prix
Italian Grand Prix
Italian Grand Prix